Mitra (Mitra) stictica, commonly known as the pontifical mitre,  is a species of sea snail, a marine gastropod mollusk in the family Mitridae, the mitres.

Description

Distribution
This species occurs in the tropical Indian Ocean off Aldabra, Chagos, the Mascarene Basin, Mauritius and Tanzania, and in the Pacific Ocean off Fiji, New Zealand, and the Solomons.

References

 Spry, J.F. (1961). The sea shells of Dar es Salaam: Gastropods. Tanganyika Notes and Records 56
 
 Drivas, J. & M. Jay (1988). Coquillages de La Réunion et de l'île Maurice

External links
 
 
 
 

Mitridae
Gastropods described in 1807